The Massachusetts Institute of Technology has had 18 presidents (16 inaugurated, 1 acting then inaugurated, 1 acting) in its 156-year history.

William Barton Rogers (1862–1870, 1879–1881) 
John Daniel Runkle (1870–1878) 
Francis Amasa Walker (1881–1897)
James Crafts (1897–1900)
Henry Smith Pritchett (1900–1907)
Arthur Amos Noyes (acting 1907–1909)
Richard Cockburn Maclaurin (1909–1920)
Elihu Thomson (acting 1920–1921, 1922–1923)
Ernest Fox Nichols (1921–1922)
Samuel Wesley Stratton (1923–1930)
Karl Taylor Compton (1930–1948)
James Rhyne Killian (1948–1959)
Julius Adams Stratton (1959–1966)
Howard Wesley Johnson (1966–1971)
Jerome Wiesner (1971–1980)
Paul Edward Gray (1980–1990)
Charles Marstiller Vest (1990–2004)
Susan Hockfield (2004–2012)
L. Rafael Reif (2012–2022)
Sally Kornbluth (beginning Jan. 1, 2023)

Lists of people by university or college in Massachusetts
Lists of university and college leaders
Presidents